Boa imperator sabogae (previously Boa constrictor sabogae) is a subspecies of large, heavy-bodied  snake. It is a member of the family Boidae.

This subspecies of Boa imperator is endemic to the Pearl Islands, off the Pacific Coast of Panama.

References

constrictor sabogae
Endemic reptiles of Mexico
Fauna of Islas Marías